Togere Venkatasubbasastry Venkatachala Sastry, commonly known as T. V. Venkatachala Shastry, is a Kannada-language writer, grammarian, critic, editor and lexicographer. He has authored in excess of 100 books, translations and has edited collections of essays, biographical sketches and felicitation volumes. Recipient of the Kannada Sahitya Akademi Award (honorary), Sastry is an authority on Kannada language grammar and its various facets ranging from the metre scale on which he has written extensively to the history of Kannada literature spanning two millennia.

His book Mulukanadu Brahmanaru is a sociological study of the Mulukanadu community since the early 17th century, outlining their origin, migration and embrace of western education. It records in detail their history with over 50 family trees and assumes importance in the field of caste studies. Sastry was a Kannada professor at the University of Mysore and additionally held the post of Director at "Kuvempu Kannada Adhyayana Samsthe" before retiring in 1994.

Early life

Origins

T. V. Venkatachala Sastry was born on 26 August 1933 at Harohalli village in Kanakapura taluk of Bangalore district to Brahmin parents Venkatasubba Sastry and Subbamma. The family belonged to the Smartha (Advaita) sect who are followers of Adi Shankaracharya and of the Sringeri Sharada Peetham. They belong to the Vaidiki Mulukanadu caste of Telugu-speaking Brahmins settled in the Kannada-speaking Mysore kingdom. Sastry's father had received a traditional education in the religious texts and puranas. He had been impressed with the practical work of the Ramakrishna Math in serving the common people. Sastry's mother was a home-maker and a deeply conservative lady.

Education

Sastry had his primary schooling at Kanakapura near Bangalore. He finished his Intermediate course in 1947–48 and from 1948 until 1954, he pursued undergraduate and post-graduate degrees at University of Mysore, where he enrolled initially in Yuvaraja College and came under the influence of Kannada professors N. Anantarangachar and U. K. Subbarayachar. In 1950, he joined the B. A. (Honours) course in Kannada at Maharaja College. Among his teaching faculty were renowned scholars like K. V. Puttappa (Kuvempu) who taught "Pampa Bharata" and "Literary Criticism", D. L. Narasimhachar (History of Literature), S. Srikanta Sastri (Cultural History of Karnataka)(see group photograph), K. V. Raghavachar (Kannada classic – "Basavarajadevara Ragale"), N. Anantarangachar (Kannada Grammar – "Shabdamanidarpana"), T. S. Shamarao (Vachanas of Basavanna) and Parameshwar Bhatt (Bharatesha Vaibhava). He worked on Pampa, Ranna, Harihara, Nemichandra, Raghavanka and Kumaravyasa utilizing ancient texts both from Mysore University library and the Oriental Research Institute, Mysore. He completed his Master of Arts (Kannada) degree from Maharaja College, Mysore in 1953–54 under the guidance of D. L. Narasimhachar.

Career

Osmania University

Sastry began his career as a lecturer at Kanakapura rural college in 1955. He moved to St. Joseph's College, Bangalore in 1957 and continued as a lecturer there until 1959. Subsequently, he was appointed as lecturer at Osmania University in Hyderabad, Andhra Pradesh in 1959 where he worked hard to lend shape to the nascent Kannada department. In addition to his teaching duties at the university, he also taught at several Women's and Arts Colleges. He involved himself in the affairs of the "Telugu Sahitya Akademi" and during these years put together his "Mahakavyalakshana".  He translated Sophocles' "Trakiya Pengal" during his tenure at Osmania University. Later he translated "Prometheus Bound" by Aeschylus into Kannada. His dictionary titled "Sreevatsa Nighantu" took form while at Osmania University. After being transferred from women's college to the university's Post Graduate department, T. V. Venkatachala Sastry involved himself teaching topics like "Kannada Chandassu", Kannada Grammar and "Suktisudarnava". It was during these years that he set out to do doctoral research and this brought him closer to his former teacher and mentor D. L. Narasimhachar. In fact, D. L. Narasimhachar suggested a doctoral work on "Kannada Neminathapurana Tulanathmaka", which T. V. V. Sastry took up in earnest. In February 1968, University of Mysore's "Kannada Adhyayana Samsthe" embarked on organising a symposium to celebrate eighth centennial of Basavanna and requested T. V. V. Sastry at Osmania University to pen a paper on "Vachana Sahitya". Sastry took up the project, returning a 60-page document that caught the attention of Kannada Adhyayana Samsthe director and his former teacher D. Javaregowda, who with H. M. Nayak persuaded him to relocate to University of Mysore in 1968 to occupy the post of Lecturer.

University of Mysore
Under the guidance of his former teacher and mentor D. L. Narasimhachar and H. M. Nayak, Sastry pursued his doctoral work on A Comparative Study of Kannada Neminathapuranas and earned his PhD by 1972. Two years later, he was made a Reader in the Kannada department and remained there until 1984 when he was elevated to the post of Professor. He continued as Professor for the next decade until his retirement in 1994. For the last few years of his tenure, he was given additional responsibilities as Director of Institute of Kannada Studies (1991 - 1993) and as Dean of Arts (1992 - 1993). Post-retirement, Sastry was visiting Professor in 1997 at Kannada University, Hampi.

Institute of Kannada Studies, Mysore

University of Mysore's Kannada Adhyayana Samsthe's prominent publications such as "Kannada Sahitya Charitre", "Kannada Chandassina Charithre", "Kannada Vishaya Viswakosha", and "Epigraphia Carnatica" owe a great deal to Sastry's erudition, perseverance and steadfast administrative acumen. His skills as an editor helped assemble and streamline many of these volumes in addition to several felicitation volumes for eminent personalities.

Literary contribution

Sastry's writings span over four decades and number in excess of 100. They encompass topics such as the history of Kannada literature, prosody, literary criticism, Kannada grammar, Kannada poetry, dictionary writing and editing, editing, and translations.

He was the first to offer an elaborate discussion on Devachandra's Rajavalikathe and Kempunarayana's Mudra Manjusha, and his PhD  attracted considerable attention in literary circles. He has authored close to seven works on Grammar, six on Prosody, two on Aesthetics, six different dictionaries on various subjects, 24 studies on Literary Criticism and Research studies, eleven biographies, twenty two edited volumes and prose works, four translations and four bibliographies. In addition to these, he has penned four plays and four collections of essays. Various articles were collectively brought out in ten volumes under the title of Śāstrīya: Samputagalu 1, 2, 3, 4, 5, 6 which was published in 1999. As an editor Sastry has led such projects as History of Kannada Literature (Mysore University), Revision and Reprint of Epigraphia Carnatica, Kannada Dictionary Project of Kannada Sahitya Parishat, Anthology of Ancient Literature, Revision and Prose Translation of Kumaravyasa Bharata by Kannada Gamaka Parishat and publication of Complete Jaina Literature by Kannada University, Hampi. Significant among the scholars who came to him were Prof Laurie Honke (Finland), Prof Showman (Canada), Prof Karl Johanssen (U.S.A), Prof Sefan Anacker (Switzerland) and the Indologist Prof Sheldon Pollock (U.S.A).

Research and literary criticism

1972 - Sāhitya Manthana
1973 - Kannaḍa Nēminatha Purāṇagaḷa Taulanika Adhyayana
1974 - Chamundaraya
1979 - Shabdarthavihara
1980 - Jaina Bhagavatha Bharathagalu: Ondu Sameekshe
1981 - Prācīna Kannaḍa Sāhitya, Kelavu Nōṭagaḷu
1981 - Muru Sameekshegalu
1982 - Hosagannada Sahitya: Kelavu Notagalu
1983 - Namma Karnataka
1983 - Pampa
1991 - Haleya Honnu
1999 - Śāstrīya: Samputagalu 1, 2, 3, 4, 5, 6
2000 - Mulakanāḍu Brāhmaṇaru: Samudāya, Saṃskrti
2007 - Kanakapura Emba Kānakāna Haḷḷiya Charitre
2009 - Kannaḍa abhijāta sāhitya : adhyayanada avakāśagaḷu, ahvānagaḷu

Grammar
1990 - Hosagannadada Vyakarana
1994 - Keshirajavirachita Shabdamanidarpanam
1997 - Keshirajavirachita Shabdamanidarpanam
2001 - Darpaṇavivaraṇa

Poetry
1969 - Mahakavyalakshana
1987 - Kannaḍa Citrakāvya: Svarūpa, Itihāsa, Vimarśe

Plays
1966 - Baddha Prometheus (Greek Original – "Prometheus Bound" by Sophocles)
1971 - Kamsa
1978 - Trakiya Pengal (Greek Original – "Trakiya Pengal" by Aeschylus)
1981 - Hosagannada Mitravinda Govinda

Prosody
1970 - Kannaḍa Chandassu
1978 - Kannada Chandahswarupa
1989 - Kannaḍa Chandōvihāra
2003 - Kannada Chandomimamse
2007 - Chandombudhi
2013 - Kannaḍa Chandaḥkōśa

Lexicography
1971 - Śrīvatsa nighaṇṭu
1977 - Kannada Ratnakosha
1994 - Gajashastrashabdakosha
2004 - Granthasampadhana Paribhashakosha

Biographies
1980 - Mahamahopadhyaya R. Shamasastry
1983 - Rao Bahadur M. Shama Rao
1985 - Sahitya Shilpigalu
1995 - A. R. Krishnashastry
2002 - Mārgadarśaka Mahanīyaru
2004 - Bhārataratna Sir M. Viśvēśvarayyanavara Pūrvajaru
2005 - Aaptaru Acharyaru
2005 - Sri Sahajanandabharathi Swamigalu
2007 - Dr A. Venkatasubbaiahanavaru

Editorship
1971 - Kavyasanchaya – Part 1 (Co-edited with others)
1973 - Srikanthika: Prof S. Srikanta Sastri Felicitation Volume
1974 - Kannada Adhyayana Samstheya Kannada Sahitya Charitre Samputa 1 – 5
1973–1993 - Epigraphia Carnatica
1975 - Samshodhana Lekhanagalu – S. Srikanta Sastri (Co-edited with others)
1970–1975 - Prabhuddha Karnataka
1976–1995 - Kannada Sahitya Parishattina Kannada Nighantu
1978 - Kavyasanchaya – Part 2 (Co-edited with others)
1978–79 - Karnataka: Kannada Vishaya Viswakosha
1982–92 - Karnataka Lochana
1983 - Swasthi – T. S. Shamarayara Felicitation Volume
1986 - Prakthana – R. Narasimhacharyara Lekhanagalu, Bashanagalu
1986 - Prof D. L. Narasimhacharyara Rudranatakopanyasagalu
1986 - S. G. Narasimhacharyara Kavithegalu
1987 - Gamaka Manjusha
1987 - Chamarasa (Co-edited with others)
1988 - Gadya Kusumanjali (Co-edited with others)
1988 - Bahubhashika Nighantu Yojane – Asian Studies Association (Chennai)
1990 - Kannada Kavigalu Kanda Gommateshwara
1991 - Anukarana Gita Lahari
1991 - Kannada Chennudi
1991 - Kavyavahini: Dasara Kavisammelanada Kavanagalu
1992 - Kavyasriranga: Dasara Kavisammelanada Kavanagalu
1992 - Alauddin mathu Adbuthadeepa
1992 - Janapriya Prachinasahityamale
1993 - Prakrit Adhyayana Mathu Samshodhana Rashtriya Samsthe
1993 - Rashtriya Viswakosha Kendra – Bhubaneswar
1993 - Prachina Bharatiya Sahitya Sankalana Yojane
1995 - Abhijnana – Dr. K. Krishnamurthy Felicitation Volume
1995 - Pampakavi Virachitam Aadipuranam – S. G. Narasimhachar
1998 - Kannada Sahitya Parishathina Kannada–Kannada–English Nighantu (1)
1999 - Mudramanjusha
2000 - Mulukanadu Mahaniyara Granthamale
2001 - Mysore Mulukanadu Sabha (R) & Mulukanadu Charitable Trust
2001 - Dr A. Venkatasubbaiahanavara Samshodhana Lekhanagalu
2002 - Mulukanadu Siri
2003 - Kannada Kavyagala Alankaragalu – Kannada Sahitya Parishathu
2003 - Siribhuvalaya
2005 - Kavyajinashtakagalu
2006 - Boppannapanditana Gommatajinendra Gunastavam
2007 - Pampasamputa
2008 - Karyakarisamithi Sadasya – B. M. Sri Smaraka Pratishthana

Translations
1986 - Vedam Venkataraya Sastri
1987 - Harivamshapuranasaara
2002 - Karnaparyana Neminatha Purana Kathasaara
2002 - Ardhanemi Purana Kathasara, Vastu Vimarshe

Essays
1975 - Kavyachitragalu
1982 - Saddentembara Ganda
1990 - Melugāḷiya Mātugaḷu: Tombattu Cintanegaḷu
2002 - Udāracaritaru Udāttaprasaṅgagaḷu

Bibliographical work
1966 - A Descriptive Catalogue of Kannada Manuscripts in the Osmania University Library (Co-edited)
1978 - A Bibliography of Karnataka Studies – Vol I
1997 - A Bibliography of Kannada Ramayana
1998 - A Bibliography of Karnataka Studies - Vol II

Recognition

Sastry's vast contribution to Kannada Literature has been acknowledged with several awards and accolades. He is also recipient of the "Karnataka Sahitya Akademi Award" (Honorary) for 1997. He presided over the Dharmasthala Literary Festival in 2002. Some of the prominent awards are listed here.

 "Kannada Chandassu" (Kannada Sahitya Akademi) (1970)
 "Kannada Chitrakavya" (Kannada Sahitya Akademi) (1987)
 "Kannada Chandovihara" (Kannada Sahitya Akademi) (1989)
 "Karnataka State Devaraja Bahadur Award" (1972)
 "Mysore Viswavidhyalaya Suvarnamahotsava Award" (1978)
 "Mysore Viswavidhyalaya T. N. Srikantaiah Smaraka Award" (1978)
 "Dharwad Vidhyavardhaka Sangha Award" (1978)
 "Karnataka State Devaraja Bahadur Award" (1978)
 "Mysore Viswavidhyalaya T. N. Srikantaiah Smaraka Award" (1986)
 Mysore 'Granthaloka' Newspaper "Writer of the year" Award (1987)
 "Karnataka Sahitya Akademi Award" for best written work (1987)
 "I.B.H Sikhsana Trust, Mumbai Award" (1987)
 "University of Mysore Golden Jubilee Award" (1987)
 "Kannada Sahitya Parishathina Vajramahotsava Award" (1977)
 "Karnataka State Award" (1988)
 Felicitation from "S. B. Joshi Vicharavedike" (1994)
 Award for lifetime contribution from Shravanabelagola Vidyapeeta (1996)
 Honorary Award from "Karnataka Sahitya Akademi" (1997)
 "Sediyapu" Award, Udupi (1998)
 "Chidananda" Award, Bangalore (2001)
 "Bhashasamman" Award from Sahitya Akademi, New Delhi (2002)
 "S. B. Joshi" Award, Karnataka Sangha, Shimoga (2003)
 "Chavundaraya" Award, Kannada Sahitya Parishath (2003)
 "Alvas Nudisiri Award", Moodabidri (2005)
 "Sri Krishna" Award from Pejawar Mutt Swamiji (2006)
 "Aryabhatta" Award, Bangalore (2006)
 "Masti" Award, Bangalore (2008) (pictured)
 "Pampa" Award for Lifetime Contribution (2008)
 Nadoja Award, Kannada University, Hampi (2022)

Legacy

Sastry currently resides in Mysore, India with his wife Venkatalakshmi and devotes his time to writing, reviewing, editing and critiquing literary works. As part of his felicitation for lifetime contribution to Kannada language and literature, two festschrift volumes "Srimukha" & "Kannada Meru" were presented. Sanskrit scholar Sheldon Pollock called him "greatest living scholar in the field of old Kannada".

References

1933 births
Kannada-language writers
Kannada people
Writers from Bangalore
Living people
20th-century Indian translators
20th-century Indian journalists
Indian editors
21st-century Indian journalists
20th-century Indian essayists
20th-century Indian biographers
20th-century Indian dramatists and playwrights